The Grundy is an art gallery located in Blackpool, Lancashire, England. Its eclectic programme consists of regional historic to recent contemporary art exhibitions. Opened in 1911, it is owned and operated by Blackpool Council.

It is a Grade II listed Edwardian building. Together with the adjoining Central library it was listed on 20 October 1983.

History
Blackpool Council commissioned the building of the Grundy Art Gallery in 1908 following a bequest of 33 artworks and a financial gift from brothers John and Cuthbert Grundy, both of whom were local artists. Cuthbert was described at the time as "A leader of the artistic, literary and scientific life of the town." Designed by Cullen, Lockhead and Brown, the gallery has coupled Ionic columns supporting a stone pediment bearing a carved Blackpool Borough crest. Together with Central library the gallery opened on 26 October 1911.

In 1912, a purchase fund for new artworks was set up to build upon the 33 artworks. By the late 1930s, the collection and general ambition of the gallery had outgrown the original building, and so an extension of two extra galleries was built. It opened in 1938.

The Grundy now contains nearly 2,000 objects.

Facilities
The Grundy is accessible by steps and there is wheelchair access to the ground floor galleries. The Grundy shop specialises in artist-made jewellery.

Exhibitions
The Grundy organises a programme of contemporary visual art exhibitions featuring the work of established and emerging artists from the UK and abroad, as well as historically important artwork loaned from major UK institutions and objects from its own permanent collection.

On 25 November 2008, American singer Mary Wilson appeared at the Grundy to launch her collection of the gowns worn by Motown female singing group The Supremes – The Story of The Supremes from the Mary Wilson Collection.

Permanent collection
Grundy's collection, which is displayed as part of the temporary exhibitions programme and is not on permanent display, includes Victorian oils and watercolours, modern British paintings, contemporary prints, jewellery and video, oriental ivories, ceramics, as well as photographs and souvenirs of Blackpool.

Works in the collection include Aircraftsman Shaw by Welsh painter Augustus John, Sanctuary Wood by English landscape painter Paul Nash, The Yellow Funnel by English painter Eric Ravilious, The Waterway by English painter Lucy Kemp-Welch and Woods and Forests by English landscape painter John Linnell.

Other artists whose work is represented include: Craigie Aitchison, Richard Ansdell, Thomas Sidney Cooper, Martin Creed, Thomas Creswick, Stanhope Forbes, Laura Ford, Gilbert and George, Herbert von Herkomer, John Frederick Herring, Sr., Edward Atkinson Hornel, Harold Knight, Laura Knight, Henry Herbert La Thangue, Peter Liversidge, David Roberts, Lindsay Seers, William Shayer, Julian Trevelyan, Eugène Joseph Verboeckhoven and Benjamin Williams Leader.

Grundy art in popular culture
In 1998 Harold Knight's painting, A Girl Writing at a Desk was used as the image on the front cover of the Virginia Woolf books A Room of One's Own and Three Guineas, published by Oxford University Press.

References

Further reading

External links
Official website

Buildings and structures in Blackpool
Tourist attractions in Blackpool
Museums in Lancashire
Grade II listed buildings in Lancashire
Infrastructure completed in 1911
Art museums and galleries in Lancashire
Art museums established in 1911
1911 establishments in England